Distaff Day, also called Roc Day or Rock Day, is 7 January, the day after the feast of the Epiphany. It is also known as Saint Distaff's Day, one of the many unofficial holidays in Catholic nations.

The distaff, or roc, used in spinning was the medieval symbol of women's work. In many European cultural traditions, women resumed their household work after the twelve days of Christmas. Women of all classes would spend their evenings spinning on the wheel. During the day, they would carry a drop spindle with them. Spinning was the only means of turning raw wool, cotton or flax into thread, which could then be woven into cloth.

Men have their own way of celebrating this occasion, called Plough Monday, the first Monday after Epiphany when men are supposed to get back to work. Every few years, Distaff Day and Plough Monday fall on the same day.

Often the men and women would play pranks on each other during this celebration, as described by Robert Herrick in his poem  "St. Distaff's Day", which appears in his Hesperides (1648). In the 20th century, Herrick's poem was set to music.

Some modern craft groups have taken up the celebration of Distaff Day as part of their New Year celebrations. Distaff Day gatherings are held, large and small, throughout local fiber communities.

References

External links
 Chambers' Book of Days – January 7

Unofficial observances
Epiphany (holiday)
January observances